Goodey is a surname. Notable people with the surname include:

Alfred E. Goodey (1878–1945), British collector of paintings, prints, and photographs
Fritha Goodey (1972–2004), British stage, radio, and film actress

See also
Goody (disambiguation)
Goudie